Marijan Urtić (born 16 January 1991) is a Swiss professional footballer who plays as a defender for Wohlen.

Career
On 8 July 2016, he joined FC Chiasso on a one-year contract.

In 2017, Urtić moved to SC Kriens.

On 11 July 2022, Urtić returned to Wohlen.

References

External links
 

1991 births
Sportspeople from Lucerne
Swiss people of Croatian descent
Living people
Swiss men's footballers
Association football fullbacks
FC Luzern players
SC Kriens players
FC Wohlen players
FC Chiasso players
Swiss 1. Liga (football) players
Swiss Super League players
Swiss Challenge League players
Swiss Promotion League players